1929 world leaders may refer to:

Sovereigns in 1929 - see List of sovereign states in 1929
State leaders in 1929 - see List of state leaders in 1929
Religious leaders in 1929 - see List of religious leaders in 1929